Zdenko Filípek (born 24 April 1995) is a Slovak football defender who currently plays for TJ OFC Gabčíkovo on loan from FK Senica.

Club career

FK Senica
He made his professional debut for FK Senica against FK Dukla Banská Bystrica on 8 March 2014.

References

External links
 
 FK Senica profile
 Eurofotbal profile

1995 births
Living people
Slovak footballers
Association football defenders
FK Senica players
Slovak Super Liga players